The Forgery Act 1870 (33 & 34 Vict c 58) is an Act of the Parliament of the United Kingdom. The whole Act, so far as unrepealed, was repealed by section 33(3) of, and Part I of Schedule 3 to, the Theft Act 1968. This Act was repealed for the Republic of Ireland by sections 1 and 2 of, and Part 4 of the Schedule to, the Statute Law Revision (Pre-1922) Act 2005.

Section 1 - Short title
This section authorised the citation of this Act by its short title.

Section 2 - Construction and extent of Act
This section provided that this Act had effect as one Act with the Forgery Act 1861, except that this Act extended to the United Kingdom.

Section 3 - Forgery of stock certificates etc
This section was repealed by section 20 of, and Part I of the Schedule to, the Forgery Act 1913.

Section 4 - Personation of owners of stock

Section 5 - Engraving plates etc for stock certificates etc
This section was repealed by section 20 of, and Part I of the Schedule to, the Forgery Act 1913.

Section 6 - Forgery of certificates of transfers of stocks from England to Ireland etc
This section was repealed by section 20 of, and Part I of the Schedule to, the Forgery Act 1913.

Section 7 - Extension of provisions of Forgery Act to Scotland
This section extended sections 2 and 4, and all provisions relative thereto, of the Forgery Act 1861 and all enactments amending those sections or provisions, or any of them, to Scotland.

Section 8 - Alteration as to Scotland

Schedule
The Schedule read:

The Act referred to was the Forgery Act 1861 (which did not have a short title when this Act was passed).

See also
Forgery Act

References
Halsbury's Statutes,
The Incorporated Council of Law Reporting. The Law Reports: The Public General Statutes, 1870. Pages 308 to 310.

External links
The Forgery Act 1870, as originally enacted, from Google Books.
List of repeals and amendments in the Republic of Ireland from the Irish Statute Book

United Kingdom Acts of Parliament 1870
Forgery